Noroit Seamount is a seamount in the Caribbean Sea, in the Anegada Passage.  It is also spelled Noroît Seamount after the French survey and research vessel RV Le Noroît which was operated by IFREMER. It is also known as Noroit Knoll. Several research projects are conducted in vicinity of Noroit Seamount.

Geology 
The seamount is a (relatively young) inactive submarine volcano, located on the boundary between the North American Plate and the Caribbean Plate.

Flora and fauna 
Noroît Seamount's marine habitats are well researched.  Investigations by the research vessel EV Nautilus in 2014 found a variety of stony corals (scleractinians), octocorals, and sponges.
Corals created habitat for brittle stars, squat lobsters and sea snails.  In the sea depth there are variety of fish — Acanthonus armatus, Bathypterois phenax, Bembrops, Conger esculentus, Coryphaenoides, Hexanchus griseus, Lepidion, Luciobrotula corethromycter, and Polymixia lowei.

References

Seamounts of the Caribbean
Extinct volcanoes